Walace Alves da Silva (born 20 October 1989), commonly known as Walace, or in some cases as Wallace, is a Brazilian footballer who plays as a central defender for CSA Steaua București.

Honours
Steaua București
Liga III: 2020–21

References

External links

Walace at Footballdatabase

1989 births
Living people
Brazilian footballers
People from Ji-Paraná
Association football defenders
Liga I players
Liga II players
FC Argeș Pitești players
FC Rapid București players
ASC Daco-Getica București players
FC Voluntari players
FC Dunărea Călărași players
FC Petrolul Ploiești players
CSA Steaua București footballers
Egyptian Premier League players
Al Ittihad Alexandria Club players
Brazilian expatriate footballers
Brazilian expatriate sportspeople in Romania
Expatriate footballers in Romania
Brazilian expatriates in Egypt
Expatriate footballers in Egypt
Sportspeople from Rondônia